Jason Wayne Strudwick (born July 17, 1975) is a Canadian former professional ice hockey defenceman and current broadcaster.

Playing career
Strudwick was drafted in the third round, 63rd overall, by the New York Islanders in the 1994 NHL Entry Draft. He played his first National Hockey League (NHL) game with the Islanders against the Hartford Whalers on March 30, 1996.

On March 23, 1998, he was traded to the Vancouver Canucks in exchange for Gino Odjick. On July 15, 2002, he signed as a free agent with the Chicago Blackhawks.

After playing for the Hungarian team Ferencvárosi TC of OB I bajnokság during the 2004–05 NHL lockout, Strudwick returned to the NHL with the New York Rangers, the team with which he had previously signed as a free agent before the lockout on July 20, 2004, for the 2005–06 season.

Strudwick began the 2006–07 season with HC Lugano in Switzerland before signing a contract on March 19, 2007, with the Rangers. However, because he signed with the team after the trade deadline, he was not eligible to participate in the 2007 Stanley Cup playoffs. In July 2007, he signed a one-year contract with the Rangers and played with them through the 2007–08 season.

On July 10, 2008, Strudwick signed a one-year contract with the Edmonton Oilers for the 2008–09 season. He would re-sign with the Oilers during the summer of 2009. On July 2, 2010, he again re-signed as a free agent with the Oilers for another one-year contract. On November 21, 2011, Strudwick signed with the Swedish club Södertälje SK of the Swedish Allsvenskan. On May 24, 2012, he announced his retirement from professional hockey.

Post-hockey career
After his retirement from the NHL, Strudwick hosted his own radio sports talk show, The Jason Strudwick Show, on Edmonton station TSN 1260, from 2012 to 2015. In May 2015, Strudwick moved to television, on Edmonton station City, where he hosted Dinner Television. The two-hour evening program featured newsmagazine and discussion segments. In May 2017, he returned to TSN as a co-host of the Jason Gregor Show.

Personal life
Born and raised in Edmonton, Alberta, Strudwick was an honours student at Archbishop MacDonald High School.  In July 2006, he married Schoena of Wyoming, whom he met when they both worked in Chicago. As of 2017, they have three children. Schoena is now a business owner in Edmonton.

Strudwick is a cousin of former NHLers Scott and Rob Niedermayer.

Career statistics

Regular season and playoffs

See also
List of family relations in the NHL

References

External links

1975 births
Battle of the Blades participants
Canadian ice hockey defencemen
Chicago Blackhawks players
Edmonton Oilers players
Ferencvárosi TC (ice hockey) players
HC Lugano players
Ice hockey people from Edmonton
Kamloops Blazers players
Kentucky Thoroughblades players
Living people
New York Islanders draft picks
New York Islanders players
New York Rangers players
Södertälje SK players
Syracuse Crunch players
Vancouver Canucks players
Worcester IceCats players